"Insomnia" is a song by British singer Craig David. It was written by David and Jim Beanz and recorded for the former's compilation album, Greatest Hits (2008). Released as the album's lead single, it became a top ten hit in Belgium and Bulgaria.

Composition
The song is performed in the key of D minor with a tempo of 125 beats per minute.

Music video
A music video for "Insomnia"  was directed by Sarah Chatfield.

Cover versions
In October 2008, Craig David asked South Korean singer Wheesung to sing a Korean version of his song "Insomnia". Wheesung's version was released in February 2009.

Track listing

Notes
  signifies an additional producer

Charts

Weekly charts

Year-end charts

References

2008 singles
Craig David songs
Dance-pop songs
2008 songs
Songs written by Jim Beanz
Songs written by Craig David
Warner Records singles
Sire Records singles
Song recordings produced by Jim Beanz